Charles Wilson (20 July 1905 – 8 April 1985) was an English footballer who played as an inside forward.

Biography 
Wilson was born in Heeley, Sheffield. He joined West Bromwich Albion as an amateur in December 1920 and turned professional two years later. In February 1928 he moved to Sheffield Wednesday for a £3,000 transfer fee. He moved on to Grimsby Town in March 1932, before joining Aston Villa in August 1933. In June 1934 he signed for Coventry City, and remained with the club until a move to Kidderminster Harriers in July 1935. Wilson joined Worcester City in August 1936, before re-joining Kidderminster in May 1937. During the Second World War he appeared as a guest player for Charlton Athletic and Aldershot. After playing for the Kidderminster Police team in 1946, he finally retired from football in 1947. He died in Kidderminster in 1985.

References 

 

1905 births
1985 deaths
Footballers from Sheffield
English footballers
Association football forwards
West Bromwich Albion F.C. players
Sheffield Wednesday F.C. players
Grimsby Town F.C. players
Aston Villa F.C. players
Coventry City F.C. players
Kidderminster Harriers F.C. players
Worcester City F.C. players